Sharon F. Matusik is an American business strategy scholar, currently serving as dean of the University of Michigan Ross School of Business. 

She is the Edward J. Frey Dean of Business and a professor of strategy and entrepreneurship at the University of Michigan. Matusik's research focuses on understanding the knowledge-intensive firm and the contribution of firm knowledge to competitive advantage in strategic management entrepreneurship.

Education
Matusik received a bachelor of arts with majors in economics and English with honors from Colby College at Waterville, Maine in 1986. She received a doctor of philosophy in business administration with concentration on strategic management from the University of Washington in 1998.

Career 
Matusik served on the faculty at Rice University before moving to the Leeds School of Business at the University of Colorado-Boulder in 2004, where she served as Academic Research Director of the Deming Center for Entrepreneurship. She rose through the ranks to become Professor in the Leeds School in 2014. In 2016, Matusik was named interim senior associate dean for Faculty and Research, and in 2017, she was appointed interim dean and later dean at the Leeds School of Business of the University of Colorado Boulder.

In 2022, Matusik moved to the University of Michigan, where she is the Edward J. Frey Dean of Business.

Research

Matusik and Hill examined the role of "contingent workers" in knowledge flows that affect competitive advantage of a firm – temporary employees, independent contractors; workers at outsourcing firms, contract workers on-site at a firm, consultants, etc.  Reliance on contingent workers can stimulate information flows inside a firm by causing firms to codify of tacit knowledge inside the firm, but also puts the firm at risk of having its special expertise appropriated.  Matusik has also studied entrepreneurship and the entrepreneurial ecosystem, such as the role of “offensive” and “defensive” patents in the pricing of initial public offerings, the role played by venture capitalists in the success or failure of startup firms.

Selected publications

References

American women academics
Colby College alumni
University of Washington alumni
University of Colorado Boulder faculty
Living people
Year of birth missing (living people)
21st-century American women
Ross School of Business faculty